John Gadsby Chapman (December 3, 1808 – November 28, 1889) was an American artist famous for Baptism of Pocahontas, which was commissioned by the United States Congress and hangs in the United States Capitol rotunda.

Life and career 

John Chapman was born in 1808 in Alexandria, Virginia.  Chapman began his study of art in Philadelphia for two years, then departed for Europe where he eventually spent time in Italy.  In 1831, Chapman returned to his hometown of Alexandria, and exhibited his artwork in the nearest metropolitan areas, such as Washington, D.C., Richmond, and Philadelphia.  He specialized in landscapes and portraits.

By 1834, Chapman had moved to New York City and become a member of the National Academy of Design, and found work as an illustrator.  In New York, Chapman embarked on a series of historical paintings, such as Landing at Jamestown and the Crowning of Powhatan.  The success of these paintings helped Chapman land a commission from the United States Congress in February 1837 to paint a historical scene for the rotunda of the Capitol building.  For this work, Chapman received a total payment of $10,000.  On November 30, 1840, Baptism of Pocahontas was formally unveiled in the Capitol rotunda.

Besides historical paintings and portraits, Chapman also produced wood engravings and etchings, and frequently contributed illustrations to Harper Brothers' publications. Chapman's American Drawing Book, published in 1847, became a standard text for art students.

On the swell of these successes, Chapman moved his family to Rome, and made an earnest living selling paintings of rural Campania to American visitors.  However, at the onset of the American Civil War, the tourist industry dried up, affecting Chapman's fortunes greatly.  In addition, Chapman's own son, Conrad Wise Chapman, returned to America to fight on the side of the Confederate States of America.

The economic deprivation inflicted on Chapman during the 1860s became insurmountable.  In Rome, he was forced to live off the kindness of fellow expatriates, and finally returned to America, sick and poor, to spend his last days with another son, John Linton Chapman, in Brooklyn, New York.  It was there, in 1889, that he died a pauper.

Publications 

The elements of art: a manual for the amateur, and basis of study for the professional artist

References

Chapman Family Correspondence and Other Documents MSS 48. Special Collections & Archives, UC San Diego Library.
Library of Virginia biography of John G. Chapman and his son, Conrad Chapman.
New York Times obituary of John Gadsby Chapman.
Chapman Family Association

Further reading 
John F. McGuigan Jr. and Mary K. McGuigan, John Gadsby Chapman: America’s First Artist-Etcher. With a Catalogue of His Italian Etchings.
Harpswell, ME: Arcady Editions, 2015.

External links 

 The McGuigan Collection of John Gadsby Chapman Etchings at the New-York Historical Society

Artists of the United States Capitol
1808 births
1889 deaths
19th-century American painters
American male painters
People from Alexandria, Virginia
American expatriates in Italy
Painters from Virginia
Davy Crockett
American history painters